Heptapleurum taiwanianum (syn. Young leaves are covered in silver hairs, while mature leaves have a smooth surface. Sprays of flowers in late summer are followed by dark berries in winter - a valued food source for insects and birds.

Related to the ivies (Hedera), Heptapleurum taiwanianum is one of several species in the hugely varied genus Heptapleurum that are grown ornamentally for their handsome foliage. It benefits from being planted in a sheltered spot with other plants to provide enough humidity. It has gained the Royal Horticultural Society’s Award of Garden Merit.

References

taiwanianum
Least concern plants
Endemic flora of Taiwan
Taxonomy articles created by Polbot
Plants described in 1924